Víctor Hugo Mora Llamas (born July 12, 1974, in Guadalajara, Jalisco), known as Víctor Mora, is a Mexican football manager and former player. Since 2020 he works at U. de G. Premier as Manager.

References

External links
 

1974 births
Living people
Footballers from Guadalajara, Jalisco
Mexican football managers
Liga MX players
Mexican footballers
Association football defenders
Club Atlético Zacatepec players
Querétaro F.C. footballers